The Di (< Eastern Han Chinese *tei < Old Chinese (B-S): *tˤij) were an ancient ethnic group that lived in western China, and are best known as one of the non-Han Chinese peoples known as the Five Barbarians that overran northern China during the Jin dynasty (266–420) and the Sixteen Kingdoms period. This ethnic group should not be confused with the earlier Dí 狄, which refers to unrelated nomadic peoples in northern China during the earlier Zhou dynasty. The Di are thought to have been of proto-Tibetan origin, though there is a widespread belief among Chinese scholars that the Di spoke a Turkic language.

Only a few special Di names and place names have been preserved in old Chinese books.

Political history
During the Jin dynasty, the five semi-nomadic tribes of Xiongnu, Jie, Xianbei, Di, and Qiang conquered northern China. Historians call this period and the polities they created the Sixteen Kingdoms. During this era, the Di ruled the states of Cheng Han (304–347), Former Qin (351–394) and Later Liang (386–403).

The tribe of Di was originally from the southern part of Gansu Province. Its leader, Fu Jian, founded Former Qin (351–394) and established his capital in Chang'an. He appointed Wang Meng, a Han-Chinese, as his prime minister. Cheng Han was a highly Sinicized administration. Its army was composed of Han-Chinese infantry and Di cavalry.

In 370 AD, Fu Jian conquered Former Yan (307–370) and in 376, Former Liang (345–376), uniting northern China under Former Qin. He then embarked upon a plan to conquer the southern Eastern Jin Dynasty (317–420).

In 383 AD, Fu Jian led a large army south with the intention of destroying Eastern Jin. He met the Jin's main forces at the Fei River in Anhui.  The Jin Army had a smaller 80,000 strong army under the command of Xie Shi (謝石) and Xie Xuan.

At the Battle of Fei River, Fu Jian observed that the Jin Army was well disciplined and stood in a rigid formation. Xie Shi and Xie Xuan saw Fu Jian's army was not ready for battle. Fu Jian's forces were an army of aggregated soldiers from many tribes in the north who were reluctant to fight his war. A messenger from the Jin side was sent across the river to see Fu Jian and requested him to pull his army back for a few kilometers so that the Jin Army could cross the river to fight the decisive battle. Fu Jian had great confidence in defeating the Jin Army due to superior numbers and he planned to attack the Jin troops when they were half way across the river. Fu Jian agreed and ordered his army to pull back. As soon as Fu Jian's order was issued convulsions spread across in his army. Some of the troops thought that they had been defeated by the Jin Army. Many of them shouted in panic, "The Qin Army are defeated. Run for your lives". Thousands of them threw down their weapons and ran for their lives. The panic developed into a stampede. Seeing that the Qin Army were running, Xie Shi led a force of 10,000 men and crossed the river to make a surprise attack on Fu Jian's camps. The Qin Army fled northward. Thousands of the Qin soldiers were trampled to death in the stampede. 

Fu Jian's campaign to conquer the south ended in disaster and his empire fell apart. He retreated to Chang'an, left his son Fu Pi (符丕) in charge of the capital, and returned to his home in southern Gansu to find new recruits among his own Di people. While on his way, Fu Jian was captured by soldiers of the hostile Later Qin (384–417) and was hanged by its ruler. His son, Fu Pi, became a new ruler of Former Qin. In 394 Former Qin was conquered by the Later Qin. The Former Qin lasted 44 years.

Culture
The Di lived in areas of present-day Gansu, Qinghai, Sichuan and Shaanxi. They were culturally related to the Qiang, but farmed in the river valleys and lived in wood frame homes with mud walls.
They might be related to the Geji (戈基) people in Qiang people stories.  During the 4th and early 5th centuries, they established Former Qin and Later Liang states of that era's Sixteen Kingdoms. 
The Di were eventually assimilated into other populations. The modern Baima people living in southeast Gansu and northwest Sichuan may be descended from the Di.

Common surnames
Li (李) family of Cheng Han
Fu (符) family of Former Qin
Lü (呂) family of Former Qin 
Lü (呂) family of Later Liang
Yang (楊) family of Chouchi

See also 
List of past Chinese ethnic groups.
Qiang people (Ch'iang people)
Cheng Han
Later Liang
Former Qin
Chouchi

References
Jin shu Xie Xuan Chuan: 晉書謝玄傳: Wen feng sheng he lei, jie yi wei wang shi [聞風聲鶴唳,皆以為王師]

External links
Described in the Wei Lue (a 3rd century CE Chinese text) - Section 1 (at University of Washington, United States)

Ancient peoples of China
Chouchi
Five Barbarians